France 3 Bourgogne is one of France 3's regional services broadcasting to people in the Burgundy region. It was founded in 1965 as FR3 Bourgogne Franche-Comté. Its headquarters are in Dijon, the city of the region. The channel is available in French and Burgundian audio tracks. France 3 Bourgogne also produces content as well.

Programming
 Z@ppez+Net 
 Impressions
 Les documentaires 
 Le monde est petit 
 Fugues
 La voix est libre
 Naturbis 
 ça manque pas d'air 
 19/20 Bourgogne
 12/13 Bourgogne

See also
 France 3

References

External links 
 Official site 

03 Bourgogne
Television channels and stations established in 1965
Mass media in Dijon